Tonight's the Night is the sixth studio album by Canadian / American songwriter Neil Young. It was recorded in August–September 1973, mostly on August 26, but its release was delayed until June 1975. It peaked at No. 25 on the Billboard 200. In 2003, the album was ranked number 331 on Rolling Stone magazine's list of the 500 greatest albums of all time, moving up to number 330 in the list's 2012 edition and climbing further to number 302 in the 2020 update. The album is the third and final of the so-called "Ditch Trilogy" of albums that Young released following the major success of 1972's Harvest, whereupon the scope of his success and acclaim became so difficult for Young to handle that he subsequently experienced alienation from his music and career.

Content
Tonight's the Night is a direct expression of grief. Crazy Horse guitarist Danny Whitten and Young's friend and roadie Bruce Berry had both died of drug overdoses in the months before the songs were written. The title track mentions Berry by name, while Whitten's guitar and vocal work highlight "Come on Baby Let's Go Downtown"; the latter was recorded live in 1970. The song would later appear, unedited, on a live album from the same concerts, Live at the Fillmore East, with Whitten credited as the sole author.

Fans have long speculated that an alternate version of Tonight's the Night exists. Neil Young's father, Scott Young, wrote of it in his memoir, Neil and Me:
Ten years after the original recording, David Briggs and I talked about Tonight's the Night, on which he had shared the producer credit with Neil. At home a couple of weeks earlier he had come across the original tape, the one that wasn't put out. "I want to tell you, it is a handful. It is unrelenting. There is no relief in it at all. It does not release you for one second. It's like some guy having you by the throat from the first note, and all the way to the end." After all the real smooth stuff Neil had been doing, David felt most critics and others simply failed to read what they should have into Tonight's the Night – that it was an artist making a giant growth step. Neil came in during this conversation, which was in his living room. When David stopped Neil said, "You've got that original? I thought it was lost. I've never been able to find it. We'll bring it out someday, that original."The band assembled for the album was known as The Santa Monica Flyers. It consisted of Young, Ben Keith, Nils Lofgren, and the Crazy Horse rhythm section of Billy Talbot and Ralph Molina. One track as stated above was taken from recordings of an earlier tour with Crazy Horse, and another from an earlier session with his band for Harvest, The Stray Gators.

Liner notes
Included with the early original vinyl releases of Tonight's the Night is a cryptic message written by Young: "I'm sorry. You don't know these people. This means nothing to you."

On the front of the insert is a letter to a character called "Waterface"; scratched into the run-out grooves on side one is the message "Hello Waterface" while the run-out grooves on side two read "Goodbye Waterface". No explanation is given to this person's identity. In Jimmy McDonough's Shakey, Young says that "Waterface is the person writing the letter. When I read the letter, I'm Waterface. It's just a stupid thing—a suicide note without the suicide." The picture of Roy Orbison in the insert is taken from a bootleg tape Young came across and, feeling bad that Orbison most likely did not know the bootleg existed, printed it in the insert for him to see.

The back of the insert has some text superimposed over the credits to Young's On the Beach album, released a year earlier. This text is reportedly the lyrics to a Homegrown-era unreleased song titled "Florida", characterized by McDonough as "a cockamamie spoken-word dream, set to the shrieking accompaniment of either Young or [Ben] Keith drawing a wet finger around the rim of a glass."

When unfolded, a whole side of the insert features a lengthy article printed entirely in Dutch. It is a review of a Tonight's the Night live show by Dutch journalist Constant Meijers for the Dutch rock music magazine Muziekkrant OOR. In 1976 Young said he chose to print it "Because I didn't understand any of it myself, and when someone is so sickened and fucked up as I was then, everything's in Dutch anyway." Meijers later spent a week at Young's ranch in California: during this visit, Young explained that he chose the article after some Dutch girls who were visiting him translated the story and made him aware of the fact "that someone on the other end of the world exactly understood what he was trying to say."

The Reprise Records label on the vinyl copy was printed in black and white rather than  the standard orange color, a process Young undertook again on the CD label art for 1994's Sleeps with Angels. Early editions of the sleeve were made on blotter paper.

In Shakey, Young maintains that along with the inserts there was a small package of glitter inside the sleeve that was meant to fall out ("our Bowie statement"), spilling when the listener took the record out. However, neither McDonough nor Young archivist Joel Bernstein have yet found a copy of Tonight's the Night featuring the glitter package.

Critical reception

Dave Marsh wrote in the original Rolling Stone review:

In a follow-up review published in the 1983 edition of The New Rolling Stone Record Guide, Marsh writes:

Chris Fallon of PopMatters said, "Tonight's the Night is that one rare record I will never tire of."

Track listing
All songs written by Neil Young, except where noted.

Personnel
 Neil Young – vocals; guitar on "World on a String", "Come On Baby Let's Go Downtown", "Mellow My Mind", "Roll Another Number", "Albuquerque", "New Mama", "Lookout Joe", and "Tired Eyes"; piano on "Tonight's the Night", "Speakin' Out", and "Borrowed Tune"; harmonica on "World on a String", "Borrowed Tune", and "Mellow My Mind"; vibes on "New Mama"
 Ben Keith – pedal steel guitar, vocal on "Tonight's the Night", "Speakin' Out", "Roll Another Number", "Albuquerque", and "Tired Eyes"; pedal steel guitar on "World on a String" and "Mellow My Mind"; vocal on "New Mama"; slide guitar, vocal on "Lookout Joe"
 Nils Lofgren – piano on "World on a String", "Mellow My Mind", "Roll Another Number", "Albuquerque", "New Mama", and "Tired Eyes"; vocal on "Roll Another Number", "Albuquerque", and "Tired Eyes"; guitar on "Tonight's the Night" and "Speakin' Out"
 Danny Whitten – vocal, electric guitar on "Come On Baby Let's Go Downtown"
 Jack Nitzsche – electric piano on "Come On Baby Let's Go Downtown"; piano on "Lookout Joe"
 Billy Talbot – bass all tracks except "Borrowed Tune", "New Mama", and "Lookout Joe"
 Tim Drummond – bass on "Lookout Joe"
 Ralph Molina – drums, vocal all tracks except "Borrowed Tune" and "Lookout Joe"
 Kenny Buttrey – drums on "Lookout Joe"
 George Whitsell – vocal on "New Mama"

Charts

Year End Album Charts

Certifications

Covers
In 2018, Australian singer-songwriter Emma Swift covered "Mellow My Mind" on a split 7-inch single with Pony Boy (the recording pseudonym of Los Angeles singer-songwriter Marchelle Bradanini), on which both musicians covered Neil Young songs.
The British band Simply Red has also recorded "Mellow My Mind" in a jazz arrangement.

Vermont band Phish has covered "Albuquerque" 16 times.

References

External links
 Lyrics at HyperRust.org
 Liner Notes also at HyperRust.org

 Tonight's the Night at Myspace (streamed copy where licensed)

Album chart usages for Canada
Album chart usages for Netherlands
Album chart usages for UK2
Album chart usages for Billboard200
1975 albums
Neil Young albums
Albums produced by David Briggs (producer)
Reprise Records albums
Albums produced by Neil Young
Albums produced by Elliot Mazer